Aamir Peerzada is an Indian journalist, documentary filmmaker and an author. He is currently working with the BBC News, based out of Delhi and Srinagar. He has also worked with NDTV as a reporter and producer till March 2017. In 2015, he filmed a challenging journey to the top of Mount Everest during the April 2015 Nepal earthquake. The documentary  Operation Everest – Summiteers to Saviours was later made using the footage recorded by Peerzada and his team. He has also produced documentary films Lighting the Himalayas and Siachen – Journey to the World's Highest Battlefield.

Peerzada has also been one of the authors for The Dark Hour: India Under Lockdowns, an anthology by Roli Books.

Early life and education 
Peerzada was born in 1991 in Kashmir, India. His father was killed by unknown gunmen in 2002.
Peerzada did his schooling from Jawaher Navodaya Vidyalaya Baramulla and then joined University of Kashmir for Bachelors in Science. He later studied Broadcast Journalism.

Award and honours 

 Ramnath Goenka Award for excellence in Journalism 2015
 Red Ink award 2016– Excellence in Indian Journalism under Sports category
 Red Ink award 2017– Excellence in Indian Journalism under Science and Innovation category

Recent work
 (2015) Operation Everest – Summiteers to Saviours NDTV
 (2016) Lighting The Himalayas NDTV

References

External links
 magazine interview
 BBC Podcast about What compelled Aamir to become a journalist?
 BBC Podcast about Surviving Everest's 2015 earthquake

Indian male journalists
Indian television journalists
Journalists from Jammu and Kashmir
Kashmiri people
Living people
1991 births
20th-century Indian journalists